Broderick D. Johnson is an Executive Vice President at Comcast and a former partner at Bryan Cave. Johnson was an Assistant to the President and the former White House Cabinet Secretary for President Barack Obama. He also serves as the Chair of the My Brother's Keeper Task Force.

Johnson was among the twenty-two highest paid White House staffers in 2014.

Education

Broderick Johnson received his Bachelor of Arts in philosophy from the College of the Holy Cross and his Juris Doctor from the University of Michigan Law School.

Career
Johnson began his career in the United States House of Representatives, where he worked on drafting legislation including the Family and Medical Leave Act and the Immigration Reform and Control Act of 1986. He later served as chief counsel to the House Committee on the District of Columbia and as Democratic chief counsel to the House Committee on Education and the Workforce. In the Clinton administration, Johnson served as Deputy Assistant to the President for Legislative Affairs.

In the private sector, Johnson was previously a vice president at AT&T and Bell South corporations. Johnson has practiced law with Bryan Cave and co-founded a strategic consulting business. Johnson is also an adjunct professor at his alma mater, the University of Michigan Law School, where he teaches government relations.

Personal life

Johnson is a native of Baltimore, Maryland. He lives in Washington, D.C. with his wife, Michele Norris, and their three children.

He has served as a board director of many groups, including Concerned Black Men, Project Northstar, and the Center for American Progress Action Fund.

References

External links

College of the Holy Cross alumni
Living people
Obama administration personnel
University of Michigan Law School alumni
Lawyers from Washington, D.C.
Year of birth missing (living people)
Lawyers from Baltimore
20th-century American lawyers
21st-century American lawyers